Shyamsila is a village development committee in Bhojpur District in the Kosi Zone of eastern Nepal. At the time of the 1991 Nepal census it had a population of 2793.

References
300

External links
UN map of the municipalities of Bhojpur District

Populated places in Bhojpur District, Nepal